The 2020 Teruel motorcycle Grand Prix (officially known as the Gran Premio Liqui Moly de Teruel) was the twelfth round of the 2020 Grand Prix motorcycle racing season and the eleventh round of the 2020 MotoGP World Championship. It was held at the MotorLand Aragón in Alcañiz on 25 October 2020.

Background

Impact of the COVID-19 pandemic 
The opening rounds of the 2020 championship have been heavily affected by the COVID-19 pandemic. The Aragon Grand Prix, scheduled in the original calendar on October 4 as the sixteenth race of the season, was brought forward by a week following the initial postponement of the Thailand Grand Prix (later cancelled on July 31) on the first Sunday in October (the Thailand stage was initially scheduled for 22 March as the second leg of the championship). Several Grands Prix were cancelled or postponed after the aborted opening round in Qatar, prompting the Fédération Internationale de Motocyclisme to draft a new calendar. A new calendar based exclusively in Europe was announced on 11 June. The race in Aragon was placed on 18 October as the tenth GP of the season.

The race organizers signed a contract with Dorna Sports, owner of the commercial rights to the sport, to host a second round on the circuit on 25 October (one week after the first race) known as the "Teruel Grand Prix". The race was named for the Teruel province of the autonomous community of Aragon where the MotorLand Aragón is located. The race is the fourth time in the history of the sport that the same venue and circuit track have hosted consecutive World Championship races, and it is the second time it has taken place in Spain.

MotoGP Championship standings before the race 
After the tenth round of the 2020 Aragon Grand Prix, Joan Mir became the new leader of the drivers' classification with 121 points, six more than the previous leader Fabio Quartararo, who in the previous race had closed out of the points zone. Third with 109 points Maverick Viñales, who overtook Andrea Dovizioso, now fourth with 106 points. Fifth is Takaaki Nakagami with 92 points.

In the manufacturers' standings, Yamaha leads with 183 points, followed by Ducati with 160 points. Suzuki is third with 143 points and has overtaken KTM, now fourth at 130. Honda is fifth at 112 points, while Aprilia closes the standings with 35 points.

In the team championship, Team Suzuki Ecstar surpasses Petronas Yamaha SRT with 206 points, with the Malaysian team now second by 4 points less from the leader. Ducati Team and Monster Energy Yamaha follow with 171 and 167 points respectively, and KTM Factory Racing with 144 points.

MotoGP Entrants 

 Stefan Bradl replaced Marc Márquez for the ninth straight race while the latter recovered from injuries sustained in his opening round crash.
 Valentino Rossi tested positive for the SARS-CoV-2 virus on October 15, requiring him to remain in quarantine for a minimum of 10 days under Italian law and forcing him to skip the Teruel round after the Aragon round. Yamaha confirmed that it would not field a replacement for Rossi's bike.

Free practice

MotoGP 
In the first session Álex Márquez was the fastest ahead of Takaaki Nakagami and Joan Mir. In the second session Nakagami preceded Maverick Viñales and Cal Crutchlow. In the third session Franco Morbidelli set the best time ahead of Nakagami and Fabio Quartararo.

Combined Free Practice 1-2-3 
The top ten riders (written in bold) qualified in Q2.

Personal Best lap

In the fourth session Viñales was the fastest ahead of Nakagami and Joan Mir.

Qualifying

MotoGP

Warm up

MotoGP 
In the warm up, Takaaki Nakagami was the fastest ahead of Franco Morbidelli and Álex Márquez.

Race

MotoGP

Moto2

Moto3

Championship standings after the race
Below are the standings for the top five riders, constructors, and teams after the round.

MotoGP

Riders' Championship standings

Constructors' Championship standings

Teams' Championship standings

Moto2

Riders' Championship standings

Constructors' Championship standings

Teams' Championship standings

Moto3

Riders' Championship standings

Constructors' Championship standings

Teams' Championship standings

References

External links

Teruel
Teruel motorcycle Grand Prix
Teruel motorcycle Grand Prix